Webb School of Knoxville is a private coeducational day school in Knoxville, Tennessee, enrolling students from pre-kindergarten to twelfth grade.  It was founded in 1955 by Robert Webb (1919–2005), grandson of Webb School of Bell Buckle founder Sawney Webb. The current President of Webb School of Knoxville is Michael McBrien.

History

Sequoyah Hills Presbyterian
In 1955, Robert Webb, then 36, made his way from the Webb School in Claremont, California to Knoxville, Tennessee, with plans to found the third school in his family.  Webb's grandfather, Sawney Webb, had established the Webb School of Bell Buckle in middle Tennessee, and his uncle Thompson Webb had started the Webb School in Claremont.  During the first school year, 4 students attended the new Webb School, but by the end of the year, the total had risen to 11.  The first two school years were held in the basement of Sequoyah Hills Presbyterian Church. The new school adopted the Latin motto of the Webb School in Claremont, "principes non homines."

Staub School
After the second school year, Webb had found a new location for the school at the old Staub School, a brick building where the University of Tennessee's aquatic center now stands.  It was formerly a medical school that was poorly cleaned after its use.  It was not uncommon for students of the Webb School to find remnants of the building's former inhabitants.  At this time, Webb's first sports teams were still without their own practice places. During its time at the Staub School, Webb admitted its first female students, establishing the affiliate Webb Girls School, which operated from a church building.

West Knoxville
In 1959, Webb relocated to the current campus location near I-140. At the time, the Sequoyah Hills location was considered "West Knoxville," and the new campus was beyond the outskirts of the city.

Coeducation
In the 1968 school year, Webb became coeducational and was reorganized into the lower school and the  upper school.

Middle school
In 1974, the school added a fifth and sixth grade to meet the rising demand.  With this addition, the school was now separated into the middle school, which consisted of grades 6-8, and the upper school, with grades 9-12. The current middle school principal is Jennifer Phillips and the current upper school principal is Matt MacDonald.

Lower school
In 1998, the new lower school opened at Webb. The new building currently houses the Kindergarten and first through fifth grade students. The current head of the Lower School is Kristi Wofford. The Webb School of Knoxville now consists of a lower school (K-5), the middle school (6-8), and the upper school (9-12).

Prekindergarten
In fall 2016, the new pre-kindergarten program began at Webb. The Junior Spartan Pre-K program is for four- to five-year-olds. Two teachers lead the program, which is also supported by certified teachers in arts, Spanish, and technology.

Construction
In early 2007, Webb's Honor the Tradition, Realize the Vision campaign to renovate and expand the campus began.  Phase I included building the new Jim and Kay Clayton Science Center, which was finished in October 2007.  The Coleman-Lange International Center for the Study of World Languages and Cultures, a building dedicated to the learning of international cultures, was completed in 2008 as well as the Founder's Commons.

Beginning in late 2019, new construction projects began on campus. In the Middle School, construction began on the new Innovation Center, set to finish construction in Fall of 2020. Also starting in fall of 2019 in the Upper School Learning Commons, meant to serve the same purpose as the Innovation Center, but with added features such as a cafe and possibly virtual reality. The final project beginning that fall is the new Central Building, meant to be a newer entrance to Webb's campus.

Houses
At the beginning of 2022, Webb started the houses program. There are six houses, named after six important figures in Webb’s history. The six are: Haslam, for the thirteen Haslam alumnis, Hudson, for Genevieve Hudson, the first headmaster of the girls school back when the school was split into boys and girls, Henslee, for Stewart Henslee, the person who gave Robert Webb the original 50 acres of campus land, Pfeifer, for William Pfeifer, a former president, Dossett, for Julie Dossett Webb, Robert Webb’s wife, and Sawney, for Sawney Webb, Robert Webb’s grandfather. Students are sorted into these houses during Middle and Upper School. They compete with other houses in games to win points. The house with the most points at the end of the year wins the house cup.

Athletics

Webb fields teams in several sports, competing in Division II (private schools) of the Tennessee Secondary School Athletic Association. Webb has athletic facilities, including football stadium, softball, baseball, soccer, lacrosse/field hockey fields, wrestling room, basketball and volleyball courts, outdoor swimming pool, outdoor track, outdoor and indoor tennis courts, and several more practice facilities.

The football team were runners-up in 1997 and 2005 and state champions in 1981, 1996, 2006, 2009, 2010, and 2012. The baseball team were state champions in 1985 & 2010. The 2010 team was led by Cole Massey and Oliver McClain. The boys cross country team was the state champion in 1990 and 2009. This achievement carried Webb to the 1990 Pepsi Cup State Championship. More recently the boys cross country team won back to back state championships in 2002, 2003, 2009, 2010, and in 2012. The girls cross country team also took a state title in 2007, 2009, 2010, and 2012. The boys lacrosse team was the 2009 East Tennessee Division II regional champions and acquired the number one LaxPower.com ranking in Division II in the state of Tennessee. The girls basketball team won a state championship in 2007 and 2009.

Sports include: baseball, basketball, bowling, cheerleading, climbing, cross country, diving, field hockey, football, golf, lacrosse, sailing, soccer, softball, swimming, tennis, track and field, volleyball, and wrestling.

High school football
The Spartans hold an intense rivalry with Knoxville Catholic High School that dates back to the 1970s.

The Spartans' first state football title (TSSAA Class A) was in the fall of 1981, when the team fielded fewer than 20 players in any one game, and most starters played offense and defense. They went 7-3 in the regular season (losing to only one Class A team) and then beat Sweetwater, Coalfield, and Meigs County in the playoffs. Webb won the championship game on December 4, 1981. It was played at Bearden High School in Knoxville, and Webb defeated Memphis Preparatory School.

Webb defeated Goodpasture, 27-20, in the TSSAA Class AA state championship.

The Spartans currently play in TSSAA Division II-A. In 2005, the Webb Spartans were finalists in TSSAA Division II-AA, losing 0-26 to the Evangelical Christian School. The next year, Webb returned to the state championship and again played ECS, winning 17-14. The win was the Spartans' third state title in football, which tied them for 11th in Tennessee for the number of football state championships. Webb's final record for the 2007 season was 9-3. The next season, the Spartans were moved to Division II-AA and made the playoffs, but lost in the first round to Montgomery Bell Academy.

In 2009, Webb moved back down to Division II-Small. The Spartans went 12-1 en route to their fourth state championship. In 2010, Webb repeated as state champions by beating St. Georges, 42-7 and finishing 13-0 on the season. Webb brought home its sixth state championship in 2012 when the Spartans defeated ECS, 47-14.

Notable alumni
 Ned G. Andrews - Winner of the 1994 Scripps National Spelling Bee
 Bill Haslam - Governor of Tennessee; previously mayor of Knoxville
 Dee Haslam - CEO and founder of RIVR Media
 Jimmy Haslam - CEO of Pilot Flying J and majority owner of the Cleveland Browns
 Trey Hollingsworth - US Representative from Indiana's 9th Congressional District
 Glory Johnson - Former Dallas Wings WNBA player
 Elizabeth Kostova - Author of The Historian
 Monica Langley - Senior Investigative Journalist for the Wall Street Journal and author 
 Sharon G. Lee - Judge on Tennessee Court of Appeals and Tennessee Supreme Court
 Greg McMichael -  Former Atlanta Braves pitcher
 Chad Pennington - Former NFL quarterback, presently sports analyst on the NFL Network
 Wes Roach - Former PGA Tour player
 Herbert Slatery - Attorney General of Tennessee
 Mike Stewart - Member of the Tennessee House of Representatives
 Tyler Summitt - Former college basketball player and coach
 Davis Tarwater - 2012 Olympics Swimming Gold Medalist

References

1955 establishments in Tennessee
Educational institutions established in 1955
Preparatory schools in Tennessee
Private K-12 schools in Tennessee
Schools in Knoxville, Tennessee